The Panther KF51 is a German main battle tank (MBT) that is under development by Rheinmetall Landsysteme (part of Rheinmetall's Vehicle Systems division). It was unveiled publicly at the Eurosatory defence exhibition on 13 June 2022. KF is short for "Kettenfahrzeug", i.e., tracked vehicle.

The KF51 is based on the hull of the Leopard 2A4. A new turret is to be mounted on the Leopard 2; the main gun is an autoloaded 130 mm calibre. On 5 December 2022 Rheinmetall announced that it plans to mainly target existing Leopard 2 operators with the KF51.

Development
Rheinmetall began the development of major subsystems related to the Panther in 2016, with system-level design commencing in 2018.  The Panther has been developed as a private venture by Rheinmetall to demonstrate by 2026 the potential for increasing the lethality, mobility, survivability, and networking capabilities of MBTs without incurring a significant increase in weight. To reduce the weight of the Leopard 2A4 platform on which the development vehicle is based, Rheinmetall prioritised active over passive protection.

Further developments under consideration for the vehicle including measures to make it more environmentally friendly during peacetime operations, the installation of a more powerful and more efficient powerpack, the integration of AI into the fire control system to enable automated target detection and identification, mounting an unmanned turret on the vehicle, and the creation of an unmanned version of the Panther. Efforts to make the vehicle more environmentally friendly could result in an alternative hull being developed for the Panther.

Ukraine
In February 2023, Rheinmetall revealed they are in talks with Ukraine to export the KF51. Company CEO Armin Papperger said the first delivery could be in 15 to 18 months and suggests a factory in the country could be possible. Rheinmetall believes a plant in Ukraine can be built for around €200 million which could produce up to 400 Panther tanks annually; it would also need to be protected against air attack from the ongoing 2022 Russian invasion of Ukraine.

Design and mobility

The KF51 is based on the hull of the Leopard 2A4; thus, It has a conventional layout for an MBT with the driver at the front, the fighting compartment/turret in the middle, and the powerpack at the rear. The driver is seated in the front right of the hull and is provided with a single-piece hatch above their position in the roof of the glacis plate. A separate crew station can be provided in the left front of the hull for either a dedicated systems operator or a unit commander. Colour cameras for the driver are installed in the centre of the front and rear of the hull. Should the KF51 enter production a new hull would be designed by Rheinmetall.

Where the design of the KF51 departs from that of the preceding generation of Western MBTs is by the introduction of a new two-person turret fitted with an autoloaded main gun. The rear of the turret houses the magazines for the main gun's automatic loader and pods for loitering munitions if these have been equipped. There are housings for cameras on all four corners of the turret and in the middle of each side of the turret.

The Panther has a combat weight of 59-tonnes making it lighter than most Western MBTs developed prior to 2022. The powerpack, tracks and most of the running gear of the vehicle are also believed to have been derived from those of the Leopard 2A4. This Leopard 2A4 powerpack consists of an MTU MB 873 Ka-501 water-cooled V12 diesel engine producing 1,479 hp at 2,600 rpm, this coupled to a Renk HSWL 354 four-speed automatic transmission. The Panther's maximum speed has not been disclosed but it has a maximum range of 500 km.

The Leopard 2A4's running gear consists of seven dual-tyred rubber roadwheels and four rubber-tyred offset track return rollers on each side, with the idler at the front and the drive sprocket at the rear. The roadwheels are supported by torsion bar suspension with advanced friction dampers. The first, second, third, sixth, and seventh roadwheels feature advanced friction dampers and hydraulic bump stops to dampen oscillations, with the fourth and fifth fitted with solid bump stops. The KF51 is fitted with an 82-link Defence Service Tracks 570F track of 635 mm width with rubber-bushed end connectors on each side.

Protection
The KF51 Panther is stated to have three layers of protection: passive, reactive and active. The innermost layer consists of all-welded steel armour covered by passive armour modules. The second layer comprises sensor-based reactive armour, while the final layer consists of Rheinmetall's Active Defence System (ADS) active protection system (APS) that Rheinmetall claims is capable of protecting against kinetic energy (KE) projectiles and anti-tank guided missiles (ATGMs). It is possible to mount the ADS on both the hull and the turret. 

The Panther is fitted with eight Rheinmetall Rapid Obscuring System (ROSY) smoke grenade launchers mounted in staggered rows of two behind the central camera housing on each side of the turret. It is possible to integrate sensors into the Panther that can detect the launch signature of ATGMs and unguided anti-tank rockets before cueing the vehicle's crew towards the threat or launching appropriate countermeasures. The Panther can be fitted with Rheinmetall's Top Attack Protection System (TAPS). This comprises a hard-kill element in which the coverage of the ADS is extended to the roof of the platform to protect against both ATGMs and unguided anti-tank rockets launched at high elevations, as well as a soft-kill element that aims to protect against threats such as loitering munitions.

Armament

The primary armament of the KF51 is a stabilised Rheinmetall Rh-130 L/51 130 mm smoothbore gun that can be elevated from −9˚ to +20˚. The Rh-130 can fire armour-piercing fin-stabilised discarding sabot (APFSDS) ammunition, programmable air burst high explosive (HE) and practice projectiles. 

The gun is fed by an auto loader that consists of two revolving drum magazines with a capacity of ten rounds each. During a test firing in April 2022, the Rh-130 mounted on a test rig was able to fire three rounds in 16 seconds, though this included the time to perform safety checks. Two hatches are located in the turret sides to allow the autoloader's magazines to be replenished within five minutes. An option is available to carry an additional 10 rounds on the back of the vehicle outside of the hull and turret. 

Secondary armament consists of a coaxially mounted 12.7 mm machine gun. A remote operated weapon station (RWS) can be mounted on the rear of the turret roof to provide close-in defence and a counter-unmanned aircraft system  capability. An option for this is the Rheinmetall 'Natter', which can be armed with a 7.62 mm gun that can be elevated from −15˚ to +85˚. When thus armed, it can carry 2,500 ready rounds. The KF51 can be equipped with the HERO 120 loitering munition system.

References

External link
 
 Brochure - Meet the radically new Panther KF51

Rheinmetall
Main battle tanks of Germany
Fourth-generation main battle tanks